Imshaugia sipmanii is a species of saxicolous (rock-dwelling) lichen in the family Parmeliaceae. Found in Venezuela, it was formally described as a new species in 2004 by Australian lichenologist Jack Elix. The species epithet honours Dutch lichenologist Harrie Sipman, who collected the type specimen.

References

Parmeliaceae
Lichen species
Lichens described in 2004
Lichens of Venezuela
Taxa named by John Alan Elix